Megistoclisma is a monotypic moth genus of the family Noctuidae erected by George Hampson in 1913. Its only species, Megistoclisma ribbei, was first described by Pagenstecher in 1886.

References

Catocalinae
Monotypic moth genera